Michael Patrick O'Connor (born August 17, 1980) is an American former professional baseball pitcher. He had a successful high school career at Mount Saint Joseph High School and then went to George Washington University.

Playing career

Washington Nationals
O'Connor's Major League Baseball debut was April 27, for the Washington Nationals against the St. Louis Cardinals, in which he earned a loss. He went five innings, gave up 3 runs on three hits, struck out two and walked four. He was called up from Triple-A New Orleans replacing the injured John Patterson. On July 6, he was optioned back to Triple-A New Orleans. On July 17, he was recalled in place of Patterson, who had been put back on to the disabled list.

San Diego Padres
On June 17, 2009, O'Connor was traded to the San Diego Padres for a player to be named later. He was released on August 10.

Kansas City Royals
On August 18, O'Connor signed a minor league contract with the Kansas City Royals, where he finished the season.

New York Mets
O'Connor joined the New York Mets organization at the start of the  season.

He had his contract purchased by the Mets on May 4, 2011. After the 2011 season, he elected for free agency.

New York Yankees
O'Connor signed with the New York Yankees on November 15 to a minor league deal.

References

External links

Retrosheet
Venezuelan Professional Baseball League statistics

1980 births
Baseball players from Dallas
Bravos de Margarita players
American expatriate baseball players in Venezuela
Brevard County Manatees players
Buffalo Bisons (minor league) players
Columbus Clippers players
George Washington Colonials baseball players
Gulf Coast Nationals players
Harrisburg Senators players
Living people
Major League Baseball pitchers
New Orleans Zephyrs players
New York Mets players
Omaha Royals players
Portland Beavers players
Potomac Nationals players
Rochester Red Wings players
Savannah Sand Gnats players
Scranton/Wilkes-Barre Yankees players
Southern Maryland Blue Crabs players
Syracuse Chiefs players
Vermont Expos players
George Washington University alumni
Washington Nationals players